Ouston can refer to three places in England:

 Ouston, County Durham
 Ouston, Ninebanks, Northumberland
 Ouston, Stamfordham, Northumberland

Other locations:
 RAF Ouston, near Ouston, Stamfordham, Northumberland